This is a list of known characters in the manga and anime series Saint Tail.

Main characters

The protagonist of the series, a fourteen-year-old girl at St. Paulia's Academy, and the daughter of a stage magician and a former phantom thief. She primarily uses her high physical ability and stage magic inherited from her father to carry out her heists, and the name "Saint Tail" comes from the ponytail she wears in conjunction with her stage magician outfit.

As Saint Tail, she has a rivalry with her classmate, Asuka Jr., who is assigned to the Saint Tail cases as an assistant detective. She eventually develops romantic feelings for him, feeling that she would be willing to be captured as long as he is the one to do it; however, she mistakenly believes that he would only have interest in Saint Tail and not "Meimi Haneoka", and that he would quickly despise her if he came to know about her deceiving him with her secret identity due to his honest personality.

After Asuka Jr. unexpectedly confesses his love to Meimi and starts a romantic relationship with her, she becomes even more afraid of the idea of him discovering her deception and is unable to open up about her own feelings, but when Seira suggests that she consider retiring from being Saint Tail, she still feels an obligation to continue helping people in need. Eventually, Rosemary exposes her identity to Asuka Jr. and kidnaps him, forcing her to perform her "last theft" as Saint Tail to rescue him. In the process, Asuka Jr., who in fact has completely forgiven her, physically "catches" her in free fall and metaphorically "catches" her by relieving her of her duty as Saint Tail, resulting in Saint Tail vanishing from the public eye while Meimi returns to a normal life. Eight years later, she cuts her hair short and eventually marries Asuka Jr. after he proposes to her.

A classmate of Meimi and son of Detective Tomoki Asuka, nicknamed  by most people around him. While he has high academic ability and intellect, he has poor social skills and has difficulty understanding romance or girls. He is brought onto the Saint Tail cases as an assistant due to his connections via his father; while he disapproves of Saint Tail's methods, he respects her altruistic motives and considers her to be an honorable rival. He meets with Saint Tail in secret and extracts a promise from her to always send him a calling card and let him know every time she embarks on a caper, and to not allow anyone else to capture her but him.

While he slowly starts developing romantic feelings for Meimi at school, one of Saint Tail's heists causes him to start having suspicions of her actually being Meimi, resulting in him unconsciously developing an extreme obsession with catching Saint Tail and ascertaining whether this is the case. In the process, he begins to sympathize with Saint Tail's actions and harbor doubts about arresting her. Eventually, he realizes that his fixation on Saint Tail's identity comes from his own feelings for Meimi and his desire to understand her better, leading to him confessing his love and beginning a romantic relationship with her.

After Rosemary forcibly reveals Saint Tail's identity as Meimi to him and kidnaps him, he worries that Meimi may have secretly been toying with him for amusement, but when Maju mocks one of Saint Tail's calling cards by calling it a "love letter", he realizes that Meimi had been trying to communicate her feelings the entire time and goes out to help her, literally and figuratively "catching" her and forgiving her for everything. Eight years later, he becomes a private detective in order to carry on Saint Tail's wish of protecting Seika City, and is implied to be using Seira's confessional tips the way she once did; he continues to help keep Meimi's secret, and eventually proposes to and marries her.

A trainee nun who uses her position to hear out the townspeople's troubles through confessionals and pass on the information to Saint Tail so she can plan out her next heist. She was the one originally responsible for making Meimi into Saint Tail, having blackmailed her into it in exchange for not revealing her ability to use stage magic, but she considers helping the "lost lambs" to be a duty from God, intends to share responsibility if Saint Tail gets caught, and gives her advice, information, support, and prayers to ensure that her heists go smoothly.

While Sawatari eventually takes a romantic interest in her, she is unable to fully return his feelings due to her position requiring her to remain celibate, but she still forms a good relationship with him regardless. Eight years later, she is implied to be giving the adult Asuka Jr. information about "lost lambs" from confessionals the way she did for Saint Tail.

Supporting characters

St. Paulia's Academy students

A transfer student and the niece of Mayor Morinaka. Having developed feelings for Asuka Jr., she believes Saint Tail to be a romantic rival and begins harassing Meimi once she suspects that they may actually be the same person. Wanting to protect Meimi from her, Asuka Jr. makes a bet with her that if Takamiya's suspicions are correct and Meimi is actually Saint Tail, Asuka Jr. will have to begin dating Takamiya, whereas if she turns out to be wrong, she will stop harassing Meimi. Saint Tail manages to trick Takamiya into believing her to be a cross-dressing adult man, resulting in her admitting her "loss" of the bet, leaving Meimi alone, and staying out of the Saint Tail cases for some time.

After witnessing Asuka Jr. hesitate in capturing Saint Tail, she tries to have Morinaka take him off of the Saint Tail cases, believing that doing so will remove the biggest obstacle to him paying attention to her. However, Asuka Jr. manages to pass the test that Morinaka gives him, forcing Takamiya to realize that nothing will be able to dissuade him from pursuing Saint Tail. Once Asuka Jr. and Meimi formally enter a romantic relationship, she ultimately decides to accept it and give them her support. Eight years later, she becomes a police officer and remains unaware of Saint Tail's identity.

A member of St. Paulia's journalism club and a photographer who prioritizes sensationalism over accuracy when making his articles. Due to his proactive nature in looking for "scoops", he is well-informed about local gossip and thus sometimes provides useful information for Meimi's heists. Although he is popular with girls in school for his good looks, he falls in love with Meimi when she pretends to show interest in his photography skills while trying to get information out of him, and his attempts at flirting with Meimi result in him earning Asuka Jr.'s jealousy.

He eventually also takes an interest in Seira after bonding with her and considers pursuing her more seriously after Meimi begins dating Asuka Jr., but soon realizes that a relationship with her would be impossible due to her need to stay celibate. Nevertheless, he feels sympathy for her restricted lifestyle as a nun and decides to take her out on a date and give her presents to make her happy. Eight years later, he becomes a paparazzi photographer.

 and 
 (Ryoko)
 (Kyoko)
Two of Meimi's classmates. In the anime, Asuka Jr. briefly challenges them to try and catch Saint Tail themselves, resulting in an ill-fated attempt that ends up strengthening their friendship in the process. 

 and 
 (Yasuhiro)
 (Chiba)
Two of Asuka Jr.'s classmates who often accompany him.

Haneoka family

During her phantom thief days, she had stolen in order to satisfy her desire to test her skills and to compete with her rival Rosemary; however, after meeting Genichiro, his kindness made her decide to turn over a new leaf, return everything she had stolen, and retire. Although she wants Meimi to take after her, she believes that Meimi "wouldn't do anything bad" and only wants her to take after her in physical abilities instead of being a phantom thief.

 Meimi's father and a professional stage magician. He met Eimi when she was on the run from the police and helped hide her with his magic tricks, treating her with unconditional love in spite of her background as a thief. He is the one who taught Meimi how to do stage magic and hopes that she will follow in his footsteps as a magician; however, he had instructed her not to show anyone her magic until she became a full-fledged magician and is thus unaware of her activities as Saint Tail.

 A hedgehog whom Meimi had bonded with at a pet shop and had been planning to buy before she ends up being bought by one of Saint Tail's heist targets. After her new owner is arrested for fraud, Meimi decides to take her in. Her name "Ruby" comes from the ruby gemstone in the engagement ring Genichiro had given Eimi. She is affectionate with Meimi and very intelligent, providing useful support to Saint Tail during her heists.

Other characters

Asuka Jr.'s father, a police detective who had pursued Lucifer in the past. Asuka Jr. joins the Saint Tail cases specifically because he considers his father to be too "incompetent" for the job. In the anime, he appears to assist his son on cases and arrest any criminals she exposes.

 The mayor of Seika City and Takamiya's uncle. He is in charge of Asuka Jr.'s appointment in the Saint Tail cases and also allows Takamiya to join at her request; while he initially considers taking Asuka Jr. off the case after Takamiya accuses him of being unmotivated, he allows him to stay on after he is able to prove himself.

A thief who runs a fortune-telling shop named "Pandora" that actually serves as a front to get her clients to hand over their goods via hypnosis. As Rosemary's adoptive daughter and accomplice, she assists her with her revenge on Lucifer by identifying Meimi as Saint Tail and using hypnosis to induce her to confess all of her guilt about deceiving Asuka Jr., thus revealing him to be her greatest weakness. She then uses her hypnosis on the townspeople to make Saint Tail into a scapegoat for her own thefts and helps Rosemary expose Saint Tail's identity to Asuka Jr. before kidnapping him. Eventually, after a brief struggle with Saint Tail, she follows her mother in finding more towns to pillage.

Her specialty is using jade powder to induce hallucinations or put people to sleep. She adopted and trained Maju as a thief, and the two of them travel around towns to steal from their inhabitants and live in luxury. She holds a grudge against Lucifer for broadcasting her real name in public via one of her calling cards, as she finds her given name "Kabako" to be embarrassing.

She and Maju arrive in Seika in the hopes of getting revenge on Lucifer, but after learning that Eimi is retired, she decides to enact her revenge on Saint Tail instead. After Meimi accidentally uses her real name on her calling card, Rosemary strikes back at her by revealing her identity to Asuka Jr. and kidnapping him. When Saint Tail arrives to rescue him, Rosemary takes an interest in her skills as a thief and offers to adopt her so she can join her and Maju in stealing for luxury, but Saint Tail refuses; eventually, after witnessing Asuka Jr. reuniting with Meimi and showing her unconditional love, Rosemary expresses wistfulness at the idea of having met someone like him twenty years earlier and decides to leave town with Maju.

References 

Characters
Lists of anime and manga characters
Magical girl anime and manga characters